Paronyms are words that are pronounced or written in a similar way but which have different lexical meanings. Paronyms contrast with homonyms, which are words with different meaning having the same pronunciation or spelling. Examples of English paronyms include:
 alternately and alternatively
 collision and collusion
 conjuncture and conjecture
 eclipse and ellipse
 excise and exercise
 prolepsis and proslepsis
 continuous and contiguous
 affect and effect
 upmost and utmost
 deprecate and depreciate

The term paronym can also refer to words that are derived from the same root, i.e. cognate words.

See also 
 -onym
 Heteronym (linguistics)
 Paronymic attraction
 Word ladder

References 

Semantic relations
Types of words